Lydia is an unincorporated community and census-designated place (CDP) in Iberia Parish, Louisiana, United States. The population was 952 at the 2010 census, down from 1,079 at the 2000 census. It is part of the New Iberia Micropolitan Statistical Area.

Geography
U.S. Route 90, a four-lane freeway, forms the northern edge of the community and leads northwest  to Lafayette and southeast  to Morgan City.

Demographics

As of the census of 2000, there were 1,079 people, 385 households, and 302 families residing in the CDP. The racial makeup of the CDP was 86.38% White, 11.21% African American, 0.09% Native American, 0.93% Asian, 0.56% from other races, and 0.83% from two or more races. Hispanic or Latino of any race were 0.65% of the population.

There were 385 households, out of which 34.5% had children under the age of 18 living with them, 62.6% were married couples living together, 10.4% had a female householder with no husband present, and 21.3% were non-families. 17.9% of all households were made up of individuals, and 9.4% had someone living alone who was 65 years of age or older. The average household size was 2.80 and the average family size was 3.16.

In the CDP, the population was spread out, with 26.5% under the age of 18, 8.7% from 18 to 24, 29.6% from 25 to 44, 22.3% from 45 to 64, and 12.9% who were 65 years of age or older. The median age was 36 years. For every 100 females, there were 104.0 males. For every 100 females age 18 and over, there were 104.4 males.

The median income for a household in the CDP was $41,146, and the median income for a family was $42,500. Males had a median income of $36,176 versus $19,211 for females. The per capita income for the CDP was $16,395. About 3.9% of families and 5.1% of the population were below the poverty line, including none of those under age 18 and 18.8% of those age 65 or over.

References

Census-designated places in Iberia Parish, Louisiana
Census-designated places in Louisiana